Elm is an unincorporated community in Elizabeth Township, Lancaster County, Pennsylvania in the United States. The community is in the Lancaster metropolitan area and in the Eastern Standard time zone.

The latitude of Elm is 40.203N. The longitude is -76.349W. Its elevation is 604 feet.

References

Unincorporated communities in Lancaster County, Pennsylvania
Unincorporated communities in Pennsylvania